The National Audiovisual Conservation Center, also known as the Packard Campus for Audio-Visual Conservation, is the Library of Congress's audiovisual archive located inside Mount Pony in Culpeper, Virginia.

Establishment
From 1969 to 1988, the campus was a high-security storage facility operated by the Federal Reserve Board. With the approval of the United States Congress in 1997, it was purchased by the David and Lucile Packard Foundation from the Federal Reserve Bank of Richmond via a $5.5 million grant, done on behalf of the Library of Congress. With a further $150 million from the Packard Humanities Institute and $82.1 million from Congress, the facility was transformed into the National Audio-Visual Conservation Center, which completed construction in mid-2007, and after transfer of the bulk of archives, opened for free public movie screenings on most weekends in the fall 2008. The campus offered, for the first time, a single site to store all 6.3 million pieces of the library's movie, television, and sound collection.

Technically, the Packard Campus (PCAVC) is just the largest part of the whole National Audio-Visual Conservation Center (NAVCC), which also consists of the Library of Congress's Motion Picture and Television Division and Recorded Sound Division reference centers on Capitol Hill, the Mary Pickford Theater, and any other Library of Congress audio-visual storage facilities that remain outside the Packard Campus.

The PCAVC design, named Best of 2007 by Mid-Atlantic Construction Magazine, involved upgrading the existing bunker and creating an entirely new, below-ground entry building that also includes a large screening room, office space and research facilities. Designers BAR Architects, project-architect SmithGroup and landscape designers SWA Group, along with DPR Construction, Inc., collaborated in what is now the largest green-roofed commercial facility in the eastern United States, blending into the surrounding environment and ecosystem.

Federal Reserve bunker

With Cold War tensions came fear that in the event of a nuclear war, the economy of the United States would be destroyed. In response to this, the United States Federal Reserve constructed a bunker to house enough U.S. currency to replenish the cash supply east of the Mississippi River in the event of a catastrophic event.

The seven computers at the facility, operated by the Federal Reserve Bank of Richmond, were the central node for all American electronic funds transfer activities.

Following a nuclear attack, this money was to be used to replenish currency supplies east of the Mississippi River.

Prior to July 1992, the bunker also served as a continuity of government facility. With a peacetime staff of 100, the site was designed to support an emergency staff of 540 for 30 days, but only 200 beds were provided in the men's and women's dormitories (to be shared on a "hot-bunk" basis by the staff working around the clock). A pre-planned menu of freeze-dried foods for the first 30 days of occupation was stored on site; private wells would provide uncontaminated water following an attack. Other noteworthy features of the facility were a cold storage area for maintaining bodies unable to be promptly buried (due to high radiation levels outside), an incinerator, indoor pistol range, and a helicopter landing pad.

The facility also housed the Culpeper Switch, which was the central switching station of the Federal Reserve's Fedwire electronic funds transfer system, which at the time connected only the Fed's member banks. The Culpeper Switch also served as a data backup point for member banks east of the Mississippi River.

Post-Cold War
In 1988, all money was removed from Mount Pony. The Culpeper Switch ceased operation in 1992, its functions having been decentralized to three smaller sites. In addition, its status as continuity of government site was removed. The facility was poorly maintained by a skeleton staff until 1997 when the bunker was offered for sale. With the approval of the United States Congress, it was purchased by the David and Lucile Packard Foundation from the Federal Reserve Bank of Richmond via a $5.5 million grant, done on behalf of the Library of Congress. With a further $150 million from the Packard Humanities Institute and $82.1 million from Congress, the facility was transformed into the National Audio-Visual Conservation Center, which opened in mid-2007. The center offered, for the first time, a single site to store all 6.3 million pieces of the library's movie, television, and sound collection.

Campus architecture
The Packard Campus was designed to be a green building, being situated mostly underground and topped with sod roofs. It was designed to have minimal visual impact on the Virginia countryside by blending into the existing landscape. From the northwest, only a semi-circular terraced arcade appears in the hill to allow natural light into the administrative and work areas. Additionally, the site also included the largest private sector re-forestation effort on the Eastern Seaboard, amassing over 9,000 tree saplings and nearly 200,000 other plantings.

The campus's data center is the first archive to preserve digital content at the petabyte (1 million gigabyte) level.

The campus also contains a 206-seat theater capable of projecting both film and modern digital cinema and which features a digital organ that rises from under the stage to accompany silent film screenings. The Packard Campus currently holds semi-weekly screenings of films of cultural significance in its reproduction Art Deco theater according to this schedule.

Events

Mostly Lost Film Identification Workshop
Every summer the Packard Campus hosts the Mostly Lost identification workshop for silent and sound films. Unidentified or misidentified silent films and film clips are screened for registered attendees, who collectively attempt to identify the unknown works. The films screened are not only from the Library of Congress's collections, but also from other participating film archives, which have included the George Eastman House, the UCLA Film & Television Archive, the EYE Film Institute of the Netherlands, the University of Southern California's Hugh M. Hefner Moving Image Archive, the Lobster Film Archive, and the Newsfilm Library at the University of South Carolina. Screenings are held in the Packard Campus Theater.

Fall Open House
The Packard Campus hosts an annual open house on the Columbus Day federal holiday, offering the general public the opportunity to tour the facility and attend presentations by campus staff about the work they do for the Library of Congress and the audio-visual collections they maintain in the facility.

References

Further reading
McCamley, N.J. Cold War Secret Nuclear Bunkers. Pen & Sword Books Ltd, 2002.

External links
National Audio Visual Conservation Center (NAVCC) home page

2007 establishments in Virginia
Archives in the United States
Audio engineering
Buildings and structures in Culpeper County, Virginia
Buildings of the United States government
Cold War history of the United States
Continuity of government in the United States
Disaster preparedness in the United States
Federal Reserve System
Film archives in the United States
Film preservation
Library of Congress
Nuclear bunkers in the United States
Television archives in the United States
Tourist attractions in Culpeper County, Virginia
Underground construction